William Michael may refer to:

 Willie Michael (1874–1938), Scottish footballer
 William Michaels (1876–1934), American heavyweight boxer
 William B. Michael (1922–2004), US physicist
 Bill Michael (1935–2016), American football player and coach
 Bill Michael (guard) (born 1935), American football

See also
 
 Michael Williams (disambiguation)